Yitian Holiday Plaza is a shopping mall in Nanshan, Shenzhen, China. It is located within the Overseas Chinese Town (OCT) area of Shenzhen, and a walking distance from a number of theme parks such as Window of the World and Splendid China. The mall features, amongst others, a Westin Hotel, an ice rink and the first Apple retail store in Shenzhen.

References

External links

 Yitian Holiday Plaza 

Shopping malls in Shenzhen
Nanshan District, Shenzhen